Alan Saperstein is an American Internet entrepreneur in the video and digital media field.  He is the co-founder of Visual Data Corporation, now called Onstream Media Corporation.

Virtual trade shows
In late 2010 Saperstein and Selman developed "MarketPlace 365" as a virtual tradeshow, where companies could display their goods and interact live with sales people through video.

Technology Patents
In 2019, Saperstein and his partners sued Facebook for patent infringement over webcast technology.

References

Living people
American businesspeople
Year of birth missing (living people)